Progress  is an unincorporated community and census-designated place (CDP) mainly in Susquehanna Township but also in Lower Paxton Township, Dauphin County, Pennsylvania, United States. The population was 9,765 at the 2010 census. It is part of the Harrisburg–Carlisle Metropolitan Statistical Area.

Progress was named for the progressive spirit of its original inhabitants.

Geography
Progress is located in eastern Susquehanna Township at  (40.288389, -76.835543), and extends east into the western part of Lower Paxton Township. It is bordered to the east by Colonial Park and to the southwest by the borough of Penbrook.

The axis roads are Jonestown Road (U.S. Route 22, running northeast–southwest) and Progress Avenue (running north–south), which interchanges with Interstate 81 a short distance to the north. Interstate 83 serves as the eastern boundary, separating Progress from Colonial Park, and with access from Exit 48 (Union Deposit Road) and Exit 50 (U.S. Route 22). US 22 leads west  into downtown Harrisburg.

Demographics

At the 2000 census there were 9,647 people in 4,386 households, including 2,557 families, in the CDP.  The population density was 3,498.4 people per square mile (1,349.5/km).  There were 4,569 housing units at an average density of 1,656.9/sq mi (639.2/km).  The racial makeup of the CDP was 75.18% White, 18.97% African American, 0.16% Native American, 1.91% Asian, 0.05% Pacific Islander, 1.29% from other races, and 2.45% from two or more races.  Hispanic or Latino of any race were 2.86%.

There were 4,386 households, 24.3% had children under the age of 18 living with them, 42.5% were married couples living together, 12.7% had a female householder with no husband present, and 41.7% were non-families. 35.3% of households were made up of individuals, and 13.6% were one person aged 65 or older.  The average household size was 2.17 and the average family size was 2.82.

The age distribution was 20.6% under the age of 18, 7.2% from 18 to 24, 29.0% from 25 to 44, 24.2% from 45 to 64, and 19.1% 65 or older.  The median age was 41 years.  For every 100 females, there were 83.9 males. For every 100 females age 18 and over, there were 80.0 males.

The median household income was $41,641 and the median family income was $54,177. Males had a median income of $36,407 versus $31,002 for females. The per capita income for the CDP was $22,533. About 6.9% of families and 7.3% of the population were below the poverty line, including 9.9% of those under age 18 and 4.1% of those age 65 or over.

References

Harrisburg–Carlisle metropolitan statistical area
Census-designated places in Dauphin County, Pennsylvania
Census-designated places in Pennsylvania